Lyreidus tridentatus is a species of crab in the family Raninidae.

Description
This species as an unusual carapace in that it is longer than it is wide. Males grow to about 5.2 cm long and 1.3 cm wide. Females grow to 3 cm wide and about 4.9 cm long. They have a reddish to reddish-brown body, with a reticulated pattern. The pereopods are pale-pinkish tan colour.

Distribution
Lyreidus tridentatus occurs in Australia, New Zealand, New Caledonia, China, Taiwan, Japan, Fiji, and Hawaii.

Habitat
This species lives on shelves and slope substrates in sandy mud.

References

External links
 Image

Crabs
Crustaceans described in 1841